Irina Bara and Ekaterine Gorgodze were the defending champions, but chose to defend their title with different partners. Gorgodze partnered Tímea Babos, but they lost in the first round to Danka Kovinić and Nadia Podoroska.

Bara played alongside Sara Errani and successfully defended her title, defeating alternates Jang Su-jeong and You Xiaodi in the final, 6–1, 7–5.

Seeds

Draw

Draw

References

External Links
Main Draw

WTA Argentina Open - Doubles
WTA Argentine Open